The Sturt Plateau, an interim Australian bioregion, is located in the Northern Territory, and covers an area of . The bioregion has the code STU. There are three subregions.

Description
The Sturt Plateau bioregion consists of gently undulating plains on lateritised Cretaceous sandstones. Its earths are neutral, sandy, and  red and yellow. The vegetation is variable-barked bloodwood woodland with a spinifex understorey.

See also

 Geography of Australia

References

Plateaus of Australia
Arnhem Land
IBRA regions
Biogeography of the Northern Territory